Physocalyx is a genus of flowering plants belonging to the family Orobanchaceae.

Its native range is Eastern Brazil.

Species
Species:

Physocalyx aurantiacus 
Physocalyx major 
Physocalyx scaberrimus

References

Orobanchaceae
Orobanchaceae genera